Naturally occurring samarium (62Sm) is composed of five stable isotopes, 144Sm, 149Sm, 150Sm, 152Sm and 154Sm, and two extremely long-lived radioisotopes, 147Sm (half life: 1.06 y) and 148Sm (7 y), with 152Sm being the most abundant (26.75% natural abundance). 146Sm is also fairly long-lived, but is not long-lived enough to have survived in significant quantities from the formation of the Solar System on Earth, although it remains useful in radiometric dating in the Solar System as an extinct radionuclide.

Other than the naturally occurring isotopes, the longest-lived radioisotopes are 151Sm, which has a half-life of 88.8 years, and 145Sm, which has a half-life of 340 days. All of the remaining radioisotopes, which range from 129Sm to 168Sm, have half-lives that are less than two days, and the majority of these have half-lives that are less than 48 seconds. This element also has twelve known isomers with the most stable being 141mSm (t1/2 22.6 minutes), 143m1Sm (t1/2 66 seconds) and 139mSm (t1/2 10.7 seconds).

The long lived isotopes, 146Sm, 147Sm, and 148Sm, primarily decay by alpha decay to isotopes of neodymium. Lighter unstable isotopes of samarium primarily decay by electron capture to isotopes of promethium, while heavier ones decay by beta decay to isotopes of europium.

Isotopes of samarium are used in samarium–neodymium dating for determining the age relationships of rocks and meteorites.

151Sm is a medium-lived fission product and acts as a neutron poison in the nuclear fuel cycle. The stable fission product 149Sm is also a neutron poison.

List of isotopes 

|-
| 129Sm
| style="text-align:right" | 62
| style="text-align:right" | 67
| 128.95464(54)#
| 550(100) ms
|
|
| 5/2+#
|
|
|-
| 130Sm
| style="text-align:right" | 62
| style="text-align:right" | 68
| 129.94892(43)#
| 1# s
| β+
| 130Pm
| 0+
|
|
|-
| rowspan=2|131Sm
| rowspan=2 style="text-align:right" | 62
| rowspan=2 style="text-align:right" | 69
| rowspan=2|130.94611(32)#
| rowspan=2|1.2(2) s
| β+
| 131Pm
| rowspan=2|5/2+#
| rowspan=2|
| rowspan=2|
|-
| β+, p (rare)
| 130Nd
|-
| rowspan=2|132Sm
| rowspan=2 style="text-align:right" | 62
| rowspan=2 style="text-align:right" | 70
| rowspan=2|131.94069(32)#
| rowspan=2|4.0(3) s
| β+
| 132Pm
| rowspan=2|0+
| rowspan=2|
| rowspan=2|
|-
| β+, p
| 131Nd
|-
| rowspan=2|133Sm
| rowspan=2 style="text-align:right" | 62
| rowspan=2 style="text-align:right" | 71
| rowspan=2|132.93867(21)#
| rowspan=2|2.90(17) s
| β+
| 133Pm
| rowspan=2|(5/2+)
| rowspan=2|
| rowspan=2|
|-
| β+, p
| 132Nd
|-
| 134Sm
| style="text-align:right" | 62
| style="text-align:right" | 72
| 133.93397(21)#
| 10(1) s
| β+
| 134Pm
| 0+
|
|
|-
| rowspan=2|135Sm
| rowspan=2 style="text-align:right" | 62
| rowspan=2 style="text-align:right" | 73
| rowspan=2|134.93252(17)
| rowspan=2|10.3(5) s
| β+ (99.98%)
| 135Pm
| rowspan=2|(7/2+)
| rowspan=2|
| rowspan=2|
|-
| β+, p (.02%)
| 134Nd
|-
| style="text-indent:1em" | 135mSm
| colspan="3" style="text-indent:2em" | 0(300)# keV
| 2.4(9) s
| β+
| 135Pm
| (3/2+, 5/2+)
|
|
|-
| 136Sm
| style="text-align:right" | 62
| style="text-align:right" | 74
| 135.928276(13)
| 47(2) s
| β+
| 136Pm
| 0+
|
|
|-
| style="text-indent:1em" | 136mSm
| colspan="3" style="text-indent:2em" | 2264.7(11) keV
| 15(1) μs
|
|
| (8−)
|
|
|-
| 137Sm
| style="text-align:right" | 62
| style="text-align:right" | 75
| 136.92697(5)
| 45(1) s
| β+
| 137Pm
| (9/2−)
|
|
|-
| style="text-indent:1em" | 137mSm
| colspan="3" style="text-indent:2em" | 180(50)# keV
| 20# s
| β+
| 137Pm
| 1/2+#
|
|
|-
| 138Sm
| style="text-align:right" | 62
| style="text-align:right" | 76
| 137.923244(13)
| 3.1(2) min
| β+
| 138Pm
| 0+
|
|
|-
| 139Sm
| style="text-align:right" | 62
| style="text-align:right" | 77
| 138.922297(12)
| 2.57(10) min
| β+
| 139Pm
| 1/2+
| 
| 
|-
| rowspan=2 style="text-indent:1em" | 139mSm
| rowspan=2 colspan="3" style="text-indent:2em" | 457.40(22) keV
| rowspan=2|10.7(6) s
| IT (93.7%)
| 139Sm
| rowspan=2|11/2−
| rowspan=2|
| rowspan=2|
|-
| β+ (6.3%)
| 139Pm
|-
| 140Sm
| style="text-align:right" | 62
| style="text-align:right" | 78
| 139.918995(13)
| 14.82(12) min
| β+
| 140Pm
| 0+
|
|
|-
| 141Sm
| style="text-align:right" | 62
| style="text-align:right" | 79
| 140.918476(9)
| 10.2(2) min
| β+
| 141Pm
| 1/2+
|
|
|-
| rowspan=2 style="text-indent:1em" | 141mSm
| rowspan=2 colspan="3" style="text-indent:2em" | 176.0(3) keV
| rowspan=2|22.6(2) min
| β+ (99.69%)
| 141Pm
| rowspan=2|11/2−
| rowspan=2|
| rowspan=2|
|-
| IT (.31%)
| 141Sm
|-
| 142Sm
| style="text-align:right" | 62
| style="text-align:right" | 80
| 141.915198(6)
| 72.49(5) min
| β+
| 142Pm
| 0+
|
|
|-
| 143Sm
| style="text-align:right" | 62
| style="text-align:right" | 81
| 142.914628(4)
| 8.75(8) min
| β+
| 143Pm
| 3/2+
|
|
|-
| rowspan=2 style="text-indent:1em" | 143m1Sm
| rowspan=2 colspan="3" style="text-indent:2em" | 753.99(16) keV
| rowspan=2|66(2) s
| IT (99.76%)
| 143Sm
| rowspan=2|11/2−
| rowspan=2|
| rowspan=2|
|-
| β+ (.24%)
| 143Pm
|-
| style="text-indent:1em" | 143m2Sm
| colspan="3" style="text-indent:2em" | 2793.8(13) keV
| 30(3) ms
|
|
| 23/2(−)
|
|
|-
| 144Sm
| style="text-align:right" | 62
| style="text-align:right" | 82
| 143.911999(3)
| colspan=3 align=center|Observationally Stable
| 0+
| 0.0307(7)
|
|-
| style="text-indent:1em" | 144mSm
| colspan="3" style="text-indent:2em" | 2323.60(8) keV
| 880(25) ns
|
|
| 6+
|
|
|-
| 145Sm
| style="text-align:right" | 62
| style="text-align:right" | 83
| 144.913410(3)
| 340(3) d
| EC
| 145Pm
| 7/2−
|
|
|-
| style="text-indent:1em" | 145mSm
| colspan="3" style="text-indent:2em" | 8786.2(7) keV
| 990(170) ns[0.96(+19−15) μs]
|
|
| (49/2+)
|
|
|-
| 146Sm
| style="text-align:right" | 62
| style="text-align:right" | 84
| 145.913041(4)
| 6.8(7)×107 y
| α
| 142Nd
| 0+
| Trace
|
|-
| 147Sm
| style="text-align:right" | 62
| style="text-align:right" | 85
| 146.9148979(26)
| 1.06(2)×1011 y
| α
| 143Nd
| 7/2−
| 0.1499(18)
|
|-
| 148Sm
| style="text-align:right" | 62
| style="text-align:right" | 86
| 147.9148227(26)
| 7(3)×1015 y
| α
| 144Nd
| 0+
| 0.1124(10)
|
|-
| 149Sm
| style="text-align:right" | 62
| style="text-align:right" | 87
| 148.9171847(26)
| colspan=3 align=center|Observationally Stable
| 7/2−
| 0.1382(7)
|
|-
| 150Sm
| style="text-align:right" | 62
| style="text-align:right" | 88
| 149.9172755(26)
| colspan=3 align=center|Observationally Stable
| 0+
| 0.0738(1)
|
|-
| 151Sm
| style="text-align:right" | 62
| style="text-align:right" | 89
| 150.9199324(26)
| 88.8(24) y
| β−
| 151Eu
| 5/2−
|
|
|-
| style="text-indent:1em" | 151mSm
| colspan="3" style="text-indent:2em" | 261.13(4) keV
| 1.4(1) μs
|
|
| (11/2)−
|
|
|-
| 152Sm
| style="text-align:right" | 62
| style="text-align:right" | 90
| 151.9197324(27)
| colspan=3 align=center|Observationally Stable
| 0+
| 0.2675(16)
|
|-
| 153Sm
| style="text-align:right" | 62
| style="text-align:right" | 91
| 152.9220974(27)
| 46.284(4) h
| β−
| 153Eu
| 3/2+
|
|
|-
| style="text-indent:1em" | 153mSm
| colspan="3" style="text-indent:2em" | 98.37(10) keV
| 10.6(3) ms
| IT
| 153Sm
| 11/2−
|
|
|-
| 154Sm
| style="text-align:right" | 62
| style="text-align:right" | 92
| 153.9222093(27)
| colspan=3 align=center|Observationally Stable
| 0+
| 0.2275(29)
|
|-
| 155Sm
| style="text-align:right" | 62
| style="text-align:right" | 93
| 154.9246402(28)
| 22.3(2) min
| β−
| 155Eu
| 3/2−
|
|
|-
| 156Sm
| style="text-align:right" | 62
| style="text-align:right" | 94
| 155.925528(10)
| 9.4(2) h
| β−
| 156Eu
| 0+
|
|
|-
| style="text-indent:1em" | 156mSm
| colspan="3" style="text-indent:2em" | 1397.55(9) keV
| 185(7) ns
|
|
| 5−
|
|
|-
| 157Sm
| style="text-align:right" | 62
| style="text-align:right" | 95
| 156.92836(5)
| 8.03(7) min
| β−
| 157Eu
| (3/2−)
|
|
|-
| 158Sm
| style="text-align:right" | 62
| style="text-align:right" | 96
| 157.92999(8)
| 5.30(3) min
| β−
| 158Eu
| 0+
|
|
|-
| 159Sm
| style="text-align:right" | 62
| style="text-align:right" | 97
| 158.93321(11)
| 11.37(15) s
| β−
| 159Eu
| 5/2−
|
|
|-
| 160Sm
| style="text-align:right" | 62
| style="text-align:right" | 98
| 159.93514(21)#
| 9.6(3) s
| β−
| 160Eu
| 0+
|
|
|-
| 161Sm
| style="text-align:right" | 62
| style="text-align:right" | 99
| 160.93883(32)#
| 
| β−
| 161Eu
| 7/2+#
|
|
|-
| 162Sm
| style="text-align:right" | 62
| style="text-align:right" | 100
| 161.94122(54)#
| 
| β−
| 162Eu
| 0+
|
|
|-
| 163Sm
| style="text-align:right" | 62
| style="text-align:right" | 101
| 162.94536(75)#
| 
| β−
| 163Eu
| 1/2−#
|
|
|-
| 164Sm
| style="text-align:right" | 62
| style="text-align:right" | 102
| 163.94828(86)#
| 
| β−
| 164Eu
| 0+
|
|
|-
| rowspan=2|165Sm
| rowspan=2 style="text-align:right" | 62
| rowspan=2 style="text-align:right" | 103
| rowspan=2|164.95298(97)#
| rowspan=2|
| β− (98.64%)
| 165Eu
| rowspan=2|5/2−#
| rowspan=2|
| rowspan=2|
|-
| β−, n (1.36%)
| 164Eu
|-
| rowspan=2|166Sm
| rowspan=2 style="text-align:right" | 62
| rowspan=2 style="text-align:right" | 104
| rowspan=2|
| rowspan=2|
| β− (95.62%)
| 166Eu
| rowspan=2|0+
| rowspan=2|
| rowspan=2|
|-
| β−, n (4.38%)
| 165Eu
|-
| rowspan=2|167Sm
| rowspan=2 style="text-align:right" | 62
| rowspan=2 style="text-align:right" | 105
| rowspan=2|
| rowspan=2|
| β−
| 167Eu
| rowspan=2|
| rowspan=2|
| rowspan=2|
|-
| β−, n
| 166Eu
|-
| rowspan=2|168Sm
| rowspan=2 style="text-align:right" | 62
| rowspan=2 style="text-align:right" | 106
| rowspan=2|
| rowspan=2|
| β−
| 168Eu
| rowspan=2|0+
| rowspan=2|
| rowspan=2|
|-
| β−, n
| 167Eu

Samarium-149
Samarium-149 (149Sm) is an observationally stable isotope of samarium (predicted to decay, but no decays have ever been observed, giving it a half-life at least several orders of magnitude longer than the age of the universe), and a product of the decay chain from the fission product 149Nd (yield 1.0888%). 149Sm is a neutron-absorbing nuclear poison with significant effect on nuclear reactor operation, second only to 135Xe. Its neutron cross section is 40140 barns for thermal neutrons.

The equilibrium concentration (and thus the poisoning effect) builds to an equilibrium value in about 500 hours (about 20 days) of reactor operation, and since 149Sm is stable, the concentration remains essentially constant during further reactor operation. This contrasts with xenon-135, which accumulates from the beta decay of iodine-135 (a short lived fission product) and has a high neutron cross section, but itself decays with a half-life of 9.2 hours (so does not remain in constant concentration long after the reactor shutdown), causing the so-called xenon pit.

Samarium-151

Samarium-151 (151Sm) has a half-life of 88.8 years, undergoing low-energy beta decay, and has a fission product yield of 0.4203% for thermal neutrons and 235U, about 39% of 149Sm's yield. The yield is somewhat higher for 239Pu.

Its neutron absorption cross section for thermal neutrons is high at 15200 barns, about 38% of 149Sm's absorption cross section, or about 20 times that of 235U. Since the ratios between the production and absorption rates of 151Sm and 149Sm are almost equal, the two isotopes should reach similar equilibrium concentrations. Since 149Sm reaches equilibrium in about 500 hours (20 days), 151Sm should reach equilibrium in about 50 days.

Since nuclear fuel is used for several years (burnup) in a nuclear power plant, the final amount of 151Sm in the spent nuclear fuel at discharge is only a small fraction of the total 151Sm produced during the use of the fuel. 
According to one study, the mass fraction of 151Sm in spent fuel is about 0.0025 for heavy loading of MOX fuel and about half that for uranium fuel, which is roughly two orders of magnitude less than the mass fraction of about 0.15 for the medium-lived fission product 137Cs. The decay energy of 151Sm is also about an order of magnitude less than that of 137Cs. The low yield, low survival rate, and low decay energy mean that 151Sm has insignificant nuclear waste impact compared to the two main medium-lived fission products 137Cs and 90Sr.
ANL factsheet

Samarium-153
Samarium-153 (153Sm) has a half-life of 46.3 hours, undergoing β− decay into 153Eu. As a component of samarium lexidronam, it is used in palliation of bone cancer. It is treated by the body in a similar manner to calcium, and it localizes selectively to bone.

References 
 Isotope masses from:

 Isotopic compositions and standard atomic masses from:

 Half-life, spin, and isomer data selected from the following sources.

 
Samarium
Samarium